The Great Neva or Bolshaya Neva is the largest armlet of the river Neva. It starts near the Spit of Vasilievsky Island (easternmost tip of the island).
Its tributaries are Fontanka, Moyka and Novo-Admiralteysky Canal.
There are two bridges across Great Neva: Palace Bridge and Blagoveshchensky Bridge.

References

Rivers of Saint Petersburg
Distributaries of the Neva